Seine-et-Oise is a former department of France, which encompassed the western, northern and southern parts of the metropolitan area of Paris. Its prefecture was Versailles and its administrative number was 78. Seine-et-Oise was disbanded in 1968 as part of the reorganisation of the departments of the Paris metropolitan area. The newly-created Yvelines department inherited the 78 number.

General characteristics
Seine-et-Oise was created on 4 March 1790 during the French Revolution. Its name comes from the two main rivers (Seine River and Oise River) flowing through it. It completely surrounded the Seine department (which included Paris itself), although it was at its narrowest just east of Seine between that department and the Seine-et-Marne department, which still exists today.

At the time of its abolition in 1968, Seine-et-Oise consisted of 688 suburban and rural communes. It had an area of 5,658 km² (2,184 sq. miles). The division of Seine-et-Oise into arrondissements changed many times. At its dissolution it had ten arrondissements: Argenteuil, Étampes, Mantes, Montmorency, Palaiseau, Pontoise, Le Raincy, Rambouillet, Saint-Germain-en-Laye and Versailles.

Abolition

At the first French census in 1801, Seine-et-Oise had 421,535 inhabitants. With the growth of the Paris suburbs, the population of Seine-et-Oise increased markedly, and by 1968 it had reached 2,943,350 inhabitants. It was judged that Seine-et-Oise, along with the Seine department, had become too large and ungovernable.  On 1 January 1968, it was split into three smaller departments: Yvelines, Val-d'Oise, and Essonne. A small part of Seine-et-Oise was also merged with parts of the Seine department (also disbanded on the same date) to create the three new departments of Hauts-de-Seine, Val-de-Marne, and Seine-Saint-Denis.

In detail, the splitting up of the Seine-et-Oise department was carried out thus: 262 communes in the central part of the department became the Yvelines department, with Versailles as the prefecture. The official number 78, which was used for Seine-et-Oise, was given to the new Yvelines department, which is the largest of the three (40% of the area of Seine-et-Oise). There were 198 communes in the south of Seine-et-Oise (32% of the area of Seine-et-Oise) that became part of the Essonne department, and the official number 91 was assigned to this department, a number that had been previously used for the Alger department in French Algeria). There were 184 communes in the north of Seine-et-Oise (22% of the area of Seine-et-Oise) that became part of the Val-d'Oise department, and the official number 95 was assigned to this department, a number that had never been used.

Of the remaining 6% of Seine-et-Oise, 18 communes were grouped with 29 communes of the Seine department to create the Val-de-Marne department, 16 communes of Seine-et-Oise were grouped with 24 communes of the Seine department to create the Seine-Saint-Denis department, and the last 9 communes of Seine-et-Oise were grouped with 27 communes of the Seine department to create the Hauts-de-Seine department.

Thus, Yvelines, Val-d'Oise, and Essonne together are smaller than the former Seine-et-Oise department (5,658 km² for the Seine-et-Oise department vs. 5,334 km² for the three departments).

Population
At the 1999 French census, the population of the former department of Seine-et-Oise was 4,554,426 inhabitants, its highest figure ever, as people relocated more and more from the center to the distant suburbs of the metropolitan area of Paris. Of the new departments created in 1968 from Seine-et-Oise, Yvelines was the most populous in 1999 with 1,354,304 residents. Seine-Saint-Denis and Hauts-de-Seine are more populous than Yvelines, but only a small part of their territory is made up of the former Seine-et-Oise.

See also

 Departments of France

References

Former departments of France in France
States and territories established in 1790
States and territories disestablished in 1968
1790 establishments in France
1968 disestablishments in France